Jon Brower Minnoch (September 29, 1941 – September 10, 1983) was an American man who, at his peak weight, was the heaviest human ever recorded, weighing .

Early life 

Hospitalizations 
Minnoch's weight continued to increase steadily until his hospitalization in March 1978 at age 36 due to heart and respiratory failure. That same year, he broke a record for the greatest difference in weight between a married couple when he married his 110-lb (50 kg) wife Jeannette and later fathered two children. Minnoch was diagnosed with massive generalized edema, a condition in which the body accumulates excess extracellular fluid. Upon his hospital admission, it was estimated by endocrinologist Robert Schwartz that he must have weighed in excess of 1,400 lbs. (635 kg) and much of his overall body mass was retained fluid.
Transportation for Minnoch was extremely difficult. It took over a dozen firemen and rescue personnel and a specially modified stretcher to transport him to University of Washington Medical Center in Seattle. There, he was placed on two beds pushed together, and it took 13 people to simply roll him over for linen changes.

Death 
He died 23 months later on September 10, 1983, aged 41.

See also 
 Khalid bin Mohsen Shaari
 List of heaviest people
 Obesity

References 

1941 births
1983 deaths
Deaths from edema
Obesity in the United States
People from Bainbridge Island, Washington
World record holders